Rheem Valley, California may refer to:
Rheem Valley, former name of Rheem, California
Rheem Valley, former name of Moraga, California